T.A.M.I. Show is a 1964 concert film released by American International Pictures. It includes performances by numerous popular rock and roll and R&B musicians from the United States and England. The concert was held at the Santa Monica Civic Auditorium on October 28 and 29, 1964. Free tickets were distributed to local high school students. The acronym "T.A.M.I." was used inconsistently in the show's publicity to mean both "Teenage Awards Music International" and "Teen Age Music International".

Synopsis
The best footage from the two concert dates was combined into the film, which was released on December 29, 1964. Jan and Dean emceed the event and performed its theme song, "Here They Come (From All Over the World)", written by Los Angeles composers P.F. Sloan and Steve Barri, the song erroneously asserting that the Rolling Stones are from Liverpool. Jack Nitzsche was the show's music director.

The film was shot by director Steve Binder and his crew from The Steve Allen Show, using a precursor to high-definition television, called "Electronovision," invented by the self-taught "electronics whiz" Bill Sargent (H.W. Sargent, Jr). The film was the second of a small number of productions that used the system. By capturing more than 800 lines of resolution at 25 frames per second, the video could be converted to film by kinescope recording with sufficiently enhanced resolution to allow big-screen enlargement. It is considered one of the seminal events in the pioneering of music films, and more importantly, the later concept of music video.

T.A.M.I. Show is particularly well known for the performance of James Brown and the Famous Flames, which features his legendary dance moves and explosive energy. In interviews, Keith Richards of the Rolling Stones has claimed that choosing to follow Brown and the Famous Flames (Bobby Byrd, Bobby Bennett, and Lloyd Stallworth) was the worst mistake of their careers, because no matter how well they performed, they could not top him. In a web-published interview, Binder takes credit for persuading the Stones to follow Brown, and serve as the centerpiece for the grand finale in which all the performers dance together onstage.

Motown Records, which by 1964 had experienced its first wave of chart-busting crossover success, was represented by three of its top acts: the Miracles, Marvin Gaye, and the Supremes.
The Miracles (Smokey Robinson, Bobby Rogers, Pete Moore, Ronnie White and Marv Tarplin) had, three months earlier, lost the services of their sole female member, Claudette (Mrs. Smokey) Robinson. Claudette, who retired from touring for health reasons, remained as a non-touring member of the Miracles, recording with the group in the studio only. Marvin Gaye, backed by Shindig! favorites the Blossoms, sang several of his greatest hits. The show also featured the Supremes during their reign as the most successful female recording group of the era. The group had three chart-topping singles from July 1964 to December 1964, with the album Where Did Our Love Go reaching number two. Diana Ross went on to work with Binder on several of her television specials, including her first solo television special and her famous Central Park concert, Live from New York Worldwide: For One and for All.

Throughout the show, numerous go-go dancers performed in the background or beside the performers, under the direction of choreographer David Winters. Among them were Teri Garr and Toni Basil. According to filmmaker John Landis's DVD commentary for the film's trailer, he and fellow ninth-grade classmate David Cassidy were in the audience for the show.

Dick Clark Productions later acquired ownership of the concert from Sargent.

In 2006, T.A.M.I. Show was deemed "culturally, historically, or aesthetically significant" by the United States Library of Congress and selected for preservation in the National Film Registry.

List of performers

Solo Performers 

 Chuck Berry (died 2017)
 Lesley Gore (died 2015)

Group Performances 
The Barbarians

 Jerry Causi - Bass, Vocals
 Ronnie Enos - Guitar, Vocals
 Bruce Benson - Guitar
 Victor "Moulty" Moulton - Drums

The Beach Boys

 Brian Wilson - Bass, Vocals
 Mike Love - Vocals
 Al Jardine - Guitar, Vocals
 Carl Wilson - Guitar, Vocals (died 1998)
 Dennis Wilson - Drums (died 1983)

James Brown and the Famous Flames
James Brown -Vocals (died 2006)
Bobby Byrd -Vocals (died 2007)
Lloyd Stallworth Vocals (died 2002)
Bobby Bennett Vocals (died 2013)

Marvin Gaye (And the Blossoms)

 Marvin Gaye - Vocals (died 1984)
 Fanita James - Backing Vocals
 Darlene Love - Backing Vocals
 Jean King - Backing Vocals

Gerry and the Pacemakers

 Gerry Marsden - Vocals, Guitar (died 2021)
 Les Maguire - Piano
 Les Chadwick - Bass (died 2019)
 Freddie Marsden - Drums, Backing Vocals (died 2006)

Jan and Dean

 Jan Berry - Vocals (died 2004)
 Dean Torrence - Vocals

Billy J. Kramer and the Dakotas

The Miracles

 Smokey Robinson - Lead Vocals
 Bobby Rogers - Tenor Vocals (died 2013)
 Ronnie White - Baritone Vocals (died 1995)
 Pete Moore - Bass Vocals (died 2017)
 Marv Tarplin - Guitar (died 2011)

The Rolling Stones

 Mick Jagger - Vocals, Maracas
 Keith Richards - Guitar, Vocals
 Brian Jones - Guitar (died 1969)
 Bill Wyman - Bass, Backing Vocals
 Charlie Watts - Drums (died 2021)

The Supremes

 Florence Ballard - Vocals (died 1976)
 Mary Wilson - Vocals (died 2021)
 Diana Ross - Vocals

Set list 
In order of appearance in the film:

Home media
During the VHS era, there was never an authorized home video release of T.A.M.I. Show in its full, original cut, although bootlegs abounded. Most of the bootlegs were missing the Beach Boys' performance. The Beach Boys had been deleted from all prints made after the movie's initial theatrical run because of a copyright dispute by the request of someone in their management. Selected numbers from the T.A.M.I. Show were edited together with performances from another concert film by the same producers, The Big T.N.T. Show, to create a hybrid work called That Was Rock. This film did receive a home video release from Media Home Entertainment's music division, Music Media, in 1984. It was felt that the film was unlikely to be released due to the cost of obtaining the publishing and performance rights to the extensive lineup of artists. (All of the four Beach Boys songs from the show eventually surfaced on DVD in Sights and Sounds of Summer, a special CD/DVD edition of Sounds of Summer: The Very Best of The Beach Boys.)

On March 23, 2010, Shout! Factory released T.A.M.I. Show on a restored, digitally remastered and fully authorized DVD, with all performances, including the Beach Boys, included. (A DVD release of the complete film by First Look Studios had been planned for 2007, but subsequently withdrawn.)

On December 2, 2016, T.A.M.I. Show was released in Blu-ray as a combo package with The Big T.N.T. Show by Shout! Factory. Both features are presented in 1080p resolution, 1.78:1 aspect ratio and DTS-HD Master Audio Stereo.

The film was shown in its entirety in Canada on First Choice Network in 1984, the 20th anniversary of its release.

T.A.M.I. Show performers in Rock and Roll Hall of Fame
Several groundbreaking artists who performed on The T.A.M.I. Show in 1964 have since been enshrined into the Rock and Roll Hall of Fame. As of 2019, those inducted are as follows:

 Chuck Berry - inducted 1986
 The Beach Boys - inducted 1988
 The Miracles - Smokey Robinson inducted 1987; The Miracles inducted 2012
 The Rolling Stones - inducted 1989
 The Supremes - inducted 1988
 James Brown & The Famous Flames - James Brown inducted 1986; The Famous Flames inducted 2012
 Marvin Gaye - inducted 1987
 Darlene Love (of The Blossoms) - inducted (solo) 2011
 Hal Blaine (of the Wrecking Crew) inducted (Musical Excellence) 2000 
 Leon Russell (of the Wrecking Crew) inducted (Musical Excellence) 2011

References

External links

"The T.A.M.I. Show essay" by David E. James at National Film Registry
The T.A.M.I. Show Remembered on its 40th Anniversary
 
 
The T.A.M.I. Show - Still A Groundbreaking Music Event
The T.A.M.I. Show essay by Daniel Eagan in America's Film Legacy: The Authoritative Guide to the Landmark Movies in the National Film Registry, A&C Black, 2010 , pp. 604–606 

1964 films
1964 in California
October 1964 events in the United States
American documentary films
American International Pictures films
Concert films
Events in Santa Monica, California
Films directed by Steve Binder
Marvin Gaye video albums
The Miracles video albums
The Rolling Stones video albums
United States National Film Registry films
2010 video albums
1960s English-language films
1960s American films